Patrick Schmidt (born 22 July 1998) is an Austrian professional footballer who plays as a forward for 2. Liga club Admira Wacker.

Career
After more than three seasons in the Admira Wacker first team, Schmidt joined Championship side Barnsley on 8 August 2019. He scored his first goal for Barnsley on 9 November 2019 against Stoke City.

On 6 February 2021, Schmidt joined Austrian side SV Ried on loan for the remainder of the 2020–21 season.

On 21 June 2021, he joined Esbjerg fB in Denmark on loan for the 2021–22 season.

Schmidt rejoined his former side Admira Wacker on 17 June 2022, signing a two-year contract with an option for an additional year.

Career statistics

References

External links

1998 births
Living people
Austrian footballers
Austria youth international footballers
Austria under-21 international footballers
Austrian expatriate footballers
Association football forwards
Barnsley F.C. players
FC Admira Wacker Mödling players
SV Ried players
Esbjerg fB players
English Football League players
Austrian Football Bundesliga players
Austrian Regionalliga players
Danish 1st Division players
Austrian expatriate sportspeople in England
Austrian expatriate sportspeople in Denmark
Expatriate footballers in England
Expatriate men's footballers in Denmark
People from Eisenstadt
Footballers from Burgenland